is a railway station on the Hokuetsu Express Hokuhoku Line in the city of Jōetsu, Niigata, Japan.

Lines

Station layout
The station has two elevated opposed side platforms connected to a dome-shaped station building underneath. The station is unattended.

Platforms

Adjacent stations

History
The station opened on 22 March 1997 with the opening of the Hokuhoku Line.

Passenger statistics
In fiscal 2015, the station was used by an average of 85 passengers daily (boarding passengers only).

Surrounding area
Hakusan Jinja

See also
 List of railway stations in Japan

References

External links

 Hokuetsu Express station information 

Railway stations in Niigata Prefecture
Railway stations in Japan opened in 1997
Stations of Hokuetsu Express
Jōetsu, Niigata